We Will Survive is a 2016 Philippine comedy-drama television series directed by Jeffrey Jeturian and Mervyn Brondial, starring Pokwang and Melai Cantiveros. The series aired on ABS-CBN's Primetime Bida evening block and worldwide via The Filipino Channel from February 29, 2016 to July 15, 2016, replacing Pasión de Amor and was replaced by Pinoy Big Brother: Lucky Season 7. Starting April 18, 2016, it was demoted to ABS-CBN's Kapamilya Gold afternoon block to give way for My Super D.

Premise
Two probinsiyanas and childhood friends, Wilma; a sure-footed family woman and Maricel; a risk-taking dreamer, both experienced heartaches that sealed their friendship—but after these heartaches, they both had a resolve that they will survive.

Wilma decides to go to Manila to forget her heartache, and find growth in terms of her career—for herself, and her family. Maricel on the other hand, decides to stay in Albay to focus on her dream and become a Hotel General Manager. With Wilma's temporary absence in Maricel's life, Maricel meets a man who will help her recover from her heartache and she immediately falls in love with this man.

Both Wilma and Maricel are seemingly recovering from their past heartaches, until one day, their lives are both shaken by one ultimate test of their friendship.

Will Wilma and Maricel survive?

Cast and characters

Main cast
 Pokwang as Wilmalyn "Wilma" Bonanza-San Juan
 Melai Cantiveros as Maria Cecilia "Maricel" Rubio-Rustia

Supporting cast
 Carlo Aquino as Pocholo Rustia
 Jeric Raval as Edwin San Juan
 John Steven de Guzman as Jude Rubio
 Bea Saw as Ana Fe Adlao
 Maris Racal as Jenny Bonanza-Ataiza
 McCoy de Leon as Ralph Ataiza
 Vangie Labalan as Maria Judith "Judy" Rubio
 Bing Davao as Nestor Bonanza
 Ahron Villena as Rodel Bernardo

Recurring cast
 Joshua Zamora as Edwin Villalobos
 Alchris Galura as Arnold Bonanza
 Genevieve Reyes as Sarah Bonanza
 Franco Rodriguez as Jesus "Jess" Espiritu
 Jana Agoncillo as Anya San Juan
 Marissa Delgado as Luz San Juan

Guest cast
 Desiree del Valle as Jessica  
 Jose Sarasola as Toffer
 Kristel Fulgar as Cyrille
 Kate Alejandrino as Michelle
 Alyssa Kangleon as Jamie
 Via Antonio as Gail
 Levi Ignacio as Roy
 Epifania "Direk Panying" Limon as  Mags
 Jong Cuenco as Mr. Rustia
 Jhade Soberano as June

Episodes

Ratings

Timeslot
We Will Survive originally aired at 5:45 PM as part of the network's Primetime Bida evening block.

On April 18, 2016, the drama was later moved to Kapamilya Gold afternoon block in a new timeslot at 5:00 PM.

See also
List of programs broadcast by ABS-CBN
List of ABS-CBN drama series

References

External links

ABS-CBN drama series
Philippine comedy television series
2016 Philippine television series debuts
2016 Philippine television series endings
Filipino-language television shows
Television shows filmed in the Philippines